Karl Arnold (1 April 1883 – 29 November 1953) was a German painter, caricaturist and comics maker. He was born in Neustadt near Coburg and died in Munich

Along with Olaf Gulbransson, Thomas Theodor Heine and Bruno Paul, Karl Arnold was one of the most important cartoonists of the first half of the 20th century in Germany. He died in 1953 at the age of 70. The couple's gravesite is in Munich's North Cemetery.

References
 http://lambiek.net/artists/a/arnold_karl.htm

1883 births
1953 deaths
German male painters
German caricaturists
German cartoonists
Artists from Berlin
People from the Margraviate of Brandenburg
20th-century German painters
20th-century German male artists